Kepler-59b is an exoplanet orbiting the star Kepler-59, located in the constellation Lyra. It was discovered by the Kepler telescope in August 2012. It completes an orbit around its parent star once every 11.9 days. It has a radius that is 1.1 times that of the Earth.

References

Terrestrial planets
Exoplanets discovered by the Kepler space telescope
Exoplanets discovered in 2012

Lyra (constellation)